Odal (oþal, Anglo-Saxon éðel, German uodal-, adel) is a Germanic word which relates to property, heritability or nobility. It can refer to the following:
 Odal (rune), a Germanic rune
after the rune, the Œ ligature
Ethel-, Aethel-, Uodal- as an element in Germanic names, see Ethel
Allodium:
 Odelsrett, a traditional Scandinavian law
 Udal law, the Scottish derivative of the Odelsrett
 Odal, Norway, a traditional district in Norway

See also
 Aetheling
 Auður (disambiguation)